Pantego Academy is a historic school building in Pantego, Beaufort County, North Carolina. It was built about 1874 and enlarged and altered to its present appearance about 1910. The main block is a two-story, five-bay frame structure with a hipped roof. It has two two-story, three-bay additions and a seven-bay rear ell. It was originally a private school and later converted for public school use.

It was listed on the National Register of Historic Places in 1984.

References

School buildings on the National Register of Historic Places in North Carolina
School buildings completed in 1874
Schools in Beaufort County, North Carolina
National Register of Historic Places in Beaufort County, North Carolina
1874 establishments in North Carolina